In mathematics, planar algebras first appeared in the work of Vaughan Jones on the standard invariant of a II1 subfactor. They also provide an appropriate algebraic framework for many knot invariants (in particular the Jones polynomial), and have been used in describing the properties of Khovanov homology with respect to tangle composition. Any subfactor planar algebra provides a family of unitary representations of Thompson groups.
Any finite group (and quantum generalization) can be encoded as a planar algebra.

Definition  
The idea of the planar algebra is to be a diagrammatic axiomatization of the standard invariant.

Planar tangle

A (shaded) planar tangle is the data of  finitely many input disks, one output disk, non-intersecting strings giving an even number, say , intervals per disk and one -marked  interval per disk. 
 

Here, the mark is shown as a -shape. On each input disk it is placed between two adjacent outgoing strings, and on the output disk it is placed between two adjacent incoming strings. A planar tangle is defined up to isotopy.

Composition

To compose two planar tangles, put the output disk of one into an input of the other, having as many intervals, same shading of marked intervals and such that the -marked intervals coincide. Finally we remove the coinciding circles. Note that two planar tangles can have zero, one or several possible compositions.

Planar operad
The planar operad is the set of all the planar tangles (up to isomorphism) with such compositions.

Planar algebra

 

with  according to the shading of the -marked intervals, and these maps (also called partition functions) respect the composition of tangle in such a way that all the diagrams as below commute.

Examples

Planar tangles

The family of vector spaces   generated by the planar tangles having   intervals on their output disk and a white (or black)  -marked interval, admits a planar algebra structure.

Temperley–Lieb

The Temperley-Lieb planar algebra  is generated by the planar tangles without input disk; its -box space  is generated by

This planar algebra encodes the notion of Temperley–Lieb algebra.

Hopf algebra

A semisimple and cosemisimple Hopf algebra over an algebraically closed field is encoded in a planar algebra defined by generators and relations, and "corresponds" (up to isomorphism) to a connected, irreducible, spherical, non degenerate planar algebra with non zero modulus  and of depth two. 

Note that connected means  (as for evaluable below), irreducible means , spherical is defined below, and non-degenerate means that the traces (defined below) are non-degenerate.

Subfactor planar algebra

Definition

A subfactor planar algebra is a planar -algebra  which is: 
 (1) Finite-dimensional: 
 (2) Evaluable:  
 (3) Spherical: 
 (4) Positive:   defines an inner product.

Note that by (2) and (3), any closed string (shaded or not) counts for the same constant .

The tangle action deals with the adjoint by:  
 

Examples and results

No-ghost theorem: The planar algebra  has no ghost (i.e. element  with ) if and only if 
   
For  as above, let  be the null ideal (generated by elements  with ). Then the quotient  is a subfactor planar algebra, called the Temperley–Lieb-Jones subfactor planar algebra . Any subfactor planar algebra with constant  admits  as planar subalgebra.

A finite depth or irreducible subfactor is extremal ( on ).  
 
There is a subfactor planar algebra encoding any finite group (and more generally, any finite dimensional Hopf -algebra, called Kac algebra), defined by generators and relations. A (finite dimensional) Kac algebra "corresponds" (up to isomorphism) to an irreducible subfactor planar algebra of depth two.

The subfactor planar algebra associated to an inclusion of finite groups, 
does not always remember the (core-free) inclusion.

The first finite depth subfactor planar algebra of index  is called the Haagerup subfactor planar algebra. It has index .

The subfactor planar algebras are completely classified for index at most 
and a bit beyond.
This classification was initiated by Uffe Haagerup.
It uses (among other things) a listing of possible principal graphs, together with the embedding theorem
and the jellyfish algorithm.  

A subfactor planar algebra remembers the subfactor (i.e. its standard invariant is complete) if it is amenable. 
A finite depth hyperfinite subfactor is amenable. 

About the non-amenable case: there are unclassifiably many irreducible hyperfinite subfactors of index 6 that all have the same standard invariant.

Fourier transform and biprojections
Let  be a finite index subfactor, and  the corresponding subfactor planar algebra. Assume that  is irreducible (i.e. ). Let  be an intermediate subfactor. Let the Jones projection . Note that .
 

Note that the word coproduct is a diminutive of convolution product. It is a binary operation.

The coproduct satisfies the equality  

For any positive operators , the coproduct   is also positive; this can be seen diagrammatically:

Let  be the contragredient  (also called  rotation).  The map  corresponds to four -clicks of the outer star, so it's the identity map, and then .

In the Kac algebra case, the contragredient is exactly the antipode, which, for a finite group, correspond to the inverse.

A biprojection is a projection  with  a multiple of a projection. 

A projection   is a biprojection iff it is the Jones projection  of an intermediate subfactor , iff .

Galois correspondence: in the Kac algebra case, the biprojections are 1-1 with the left coideal subalgebras, which, for a finite group, correspond to the subgroups.

For any irreducible subfactor planar algebra, the set of biprojections is a finite lattice, of the form , as for an interval of finite groups .

Using the biprojections, we can make the intermediate subfactor planar algebras.

The uncertainty principle extends to any irreducible subfactor planar algebra :

Noncommutative uncertainty principle: Let , nonzero. Then
 
Assuming  and  positive, the equality holds if and only if  is a biprojection. More generally, the equality holds if and only if  is the bi-shift of a biprojection.

References

Operator algebras
Diagram algebras
Knot theory